The 2011 Championship Cup, (known for commercial reasons as the Northern Rail Cup), was the 10th season of the rugby league football competition for clubs in Great Britain's Co-operative Championship and Championship One.

Leigh Centurions won the final against Halifax by the score of 20–16. The match was played at Bloomfield Road in Blackpool.

Format 
The twenty teams are split up into two pools.

Pool A: Featherstone Rovers, Doncaster, London Skolars, Widnes Vikings, Toulouse Olympique, York City Knights, Keighley Cougars, Barrow Raiders, Rochdale Hornets, Dewsbury Rams.

Pool B: Swinton Lions, Halifax RLFC, Batley Bulldogs, Leigh Centurions, Gateshead Thunder, Sheffield Eagles, Oldham, Hunslet Hawks, Workington Town, Whitehaven RLFC.

Each team played two home games and two away games against teams in their pool. The top four teams in each pool following the conclusion of the group stage fixtures progressed into an open draw for the knock-out quarter-final stage. The competition started on 5 February.

Toulouse Olympique competed in the competition for the first time after the withdrawal of Blackpool Panthers who have entered administration. The South Wales Scorpions did not compete.

2011 Competition results

Pool 1

Round 1

Round 2

Round 3

Round 4

Pool 1 Qualification Table

Source: Northern Rail Cup Table – The RFL

Classification: 1st on competition points; 2nd on match points difference.
Competition Points: For win = 3; For draw = 2; For loss by 12 points or fewer = 1

Pool 2

Round 1

Round 2

Round 3

Round 4

Pool 2 Qualification Table

Source: Northern Rail Cup Table – The RFL

Classification: 1st on competition points; 2nd on match points difference.
Competition Points: For win = 3; For draw = 2; For loss by 12 points or fewer = 1

Finals

Finals Tournament Bracket

Quarter-finals

Semi-finals
The semi-finals took place on 16 and 19 June with Sky Sports broadcasting the Featherstone v Halifax game live on Thursday 16 June.

Final
The Northern Rail Cup Final took place at Bloomfield Road, Blackpool on Sunday 17 July at 17:00 GMT live on Sky Sports 3. The Match was contested by Halifax RLFC and Leigh Centurions.

This was Halifax's first appearance in the National League Cup final and was he fourth time Leigh have appeared in the final after making the finals in 2003 and winning the final in 2004 & 2006.

The game was won by Leigh 20 points to 16 with Leigh scoring in the final minute thanks to Tom Armstrong. The victory fulfils the on-field criteria that clubs must meet to be allowed to apply for a Super League licence for the 2015–17 period. Leigh Centurions have become the first club to have won the competition on 3 occasions.

References

External links
 https://web.archive.org/web/20080831022046/http://www.therfl.co.uk/index.php
 http://www.northernrail.org/northernrailcup

National League Cup
Championship Cup
2011 in French rugby league